Kyle Lawrence Card (born July 27, 1985) is a Canadian actor and television reporter. Card is best known for his role of Kyle in the Japanese on demand series “The Benza” and spin-off series “Benza English” on Amazon Prime Video. He also works as a reporter for multiple NHK World programs, including "Journeys in Japan", "Trails to Oishii Tokyo", and "Tokyo Eye 2020". Card is fluent in Japanese and has won awards for his acting abilities in it.

Early life
Card was born in British Columbia, Canada. From the age of six he developed an interest in Japanese culture after watching the animated film "Akira" on television. This led him to study the Japanese language in university. He participated in a one-year exchange program to Tokyo in 2005 when he was 20 years old.

Career

Card moved back to Japan in 2011 to pursue an acting career in the Japanese entertainment industry. His first regular television job was the live news show "Goji ni Muchuu!" on the TokyoMX network, a position he maintained for two years. He has also worked as a reporter on the NHK World programs "Journeys in Japan", "Trails to Tsukiji" and "Tokyo Eye 2020".

Card has appeared in various video games including The Evil Within 2 and Death Stranding as a 3D motion-capture performer. As an actor, Card appeared on NHK-E Television’s “EiEiGo!” as a regular cast member through the show’s entire duration.

Currently, he stars as Kyle in “The Benza” and “Benza English” on Amazon Prime Video, and worked as a voice actor for the video game tie-in  “The Benza RPG”.

References

External links

1985 births
Living people
Canadian male television actors
Canadian expatriates in Japan
Canadian television personalities
Expatriate television personalities in Japan
Canadian male video game actors
21st-century Canadian male actors